Meghana Gaonkar (born 8 May 1986) is an Indian actress working in Kannada cinema. She made her acting debut in 2010, with the film Nam Areal Ond Dina.

Early life

Meghana Gaonkar was born in Kalaburgi. She did her schooling from Sharanbasaveshwara Residential School in Kalaburgi and later completed her Bachelors in commerce degree from Sri Bhagawan Mahaveer Jain College, Bangalore. She obtained her master's degree in English literature from Bangalore University and a diploma in film acting and making from Adarsha Film & TV Institute, Bangalore. She is currently  pursuing  her P. HD in Literature.

Career
Gaonkar began her career as a television actress. She made her big screen appearance together with a debutant team of actors and director in Nam Areal Ond Dina (2010). Her role of Chinnu won her rave reviews though the film  failed to perform well commercially. Next, she paired with Vijay Raghavendra in the multi-starrer film Vinayaka Geleyara Balaga in 2011. The same year she appeared in the film Thuglak alongside Rakshith Shetty. Noted film maker R. Chandru cast her in his forthcoming film Charminar opposite Prem Kumar. “Simpallag innondh love story” directed by simple suni, 2016. 
Most recently seen in “Kalidasa Kannada Meshtru” with Jaggesh in 2019. 
“Shubhamangala” is all set to release in 2021. 
“Karva 3” shooting begins soon.

Filmography

References

External links

 
 
 

Living people
Indian film actresses
Actresses in Kannada cinema
Kannada actresses
Actresses from Karnataka
People from Kalaburagi
1985 births
21st-century Indian actresses